Physicians for a National Health Program (PNHP) is an advocacy organization of more than 20,000 American physicians, medical students, and health professionals that supports a universal, comprehensive single-payer national health insurance program. Since being co-founded in 1987 by physicians David Himmelstein and Steffie Woolhandler, PNHP has advocated for reform in the U.S. health care system.

PNHP is the only national physician organization in the United States dedicated exclusively to implementing a single-payer national health program. The organization and its members work to educate physicians and other health professionals about the benefits of a single-payer system, including fewer administrative costs and affording health insurance for the millions of Americans who have none. Additionally, PNHP performs research on the health crisis and the need for fundamental reform, coordinates speakers and forums, participates in town hall meetings and debates, contributes scholarly articles to peer-reviewed medical journals, and appears regularly on national television and news programs advocating for a single-payer system.

The group is best known for its influential proposals for national health insurance, which have been published in the New England Journal of Medicine, JAMA, and the American Journal of Public Health.

The group is also known for its members' substantial contributions to scientific research on the uninsured, health system economics and international health systems. Members such as David Himmelstein, Steffie Woolhandler, Marcia Angell and Arnold Relman have contributed articles to major peer-reviewed journals such as the New England Journal of Medicine (of which Angell and Relman are former editors-in-chief), JAMA, Health Affairs, and The American Journal of Medicine. Quentin Young was president of the organization from 1991 to 1993.

See also
 Health care reform
 List of healthcare reform advocacy groups in the United States
 Medicare for All Act
 National Physicians Alliance
 Physicians' Council for Responsible Reform
 Universal health care

References

External links
 Physicians for a National Health Program official website

Medical and health organizations based in Illinois
Healthcare reform advocacy groups in the United States
1987 establishments in the United States